Kanayama-cho is a Hiroden station (tram stop) on Hiroden Main Line, located in Kanayama-cho, Naka-ku, Hiroshima.

Routes
From Kanayama-cho Station, there are three of Hiroden Streetcar routes.

 Hiroshima Station - Hiroshima Port Route
 Hiroshima Station - Hiroden-miyajima-guchi Route
 Hiroshima Station - Eba Route

Connections
█ Main Line
  
Inari-machi — Kanayama-cho — Ebisu-cho

Around station
Momiji Bank - head office
Hiroshima Mazda building
Hiroshima Municipal Noboricho Elementary School
Elisabeth University of Music
Hiroshima World peace Memorial Cathedral
SOLARE HOTELS&RESORTS CHISUN HOTEL HIROSHIMA

History
Opened as "Yamagichi-cho" on November 23, 1912.
Renamed to the present name "Kanayama-cho" on April 1, 1965.

See also
Hiroden Streetcar Lines and Routes

References

Kanayama-cho Station
Railway stations in Japan opened in 1912